Ovidi Montllor (4 February 1942 in Alcoi, Spain – 10 March 1995 in Barcelona, Spain) was a Spanish singer-songwriter and actor.

Career
A native of Alcoi, at the age of 24 Montllor moved to Barcelona, where he was a member of various independent theater groups, including the CICF, and later with Núria Espert and Adrià Gual. In 1968, he began to sing songs with lyrics by songwriters such as Vincent Andrés Estellés, Pere Quart, as well as writing several songs by himself.

Montllor was known for his deep voice and his histrionic on-stage manners, and went on to become one of the most talented members of the Nova Cançó movement, albeit one of the least popular. As a result of the tributes paid to him by internationally renowned artists such as Miquel Gil and Pascal Comelade, his work has received increased attention from music lovers in the last few years.

Montllor's gift for acting led to him being cast alongside Lola Gaos in José Luis Borau's Furtivos, one of the most important films in the history of Spanish cinema.

Illness and death
Montllor died of esophageal cancer in Barcelona on 10 March 1995, at the age of 53. Five months earlier, his hometown of Alcoi had paid him an emotional tribute in recognition of his success.

Tributes
In 2005, on the tenth anniversary of his death, a series of tributes and celebrations in honour of Montllor took place throughout the Catalan countries.

Also in 2005, Inadaptats, a Catalan independentist music band, recorded a CD entitled "Homenatge a Ovidi" ("A Tribute to Ovidi") with covers of 14 of Montllor's most famous songs.

Valencian pro-independence band Obrint Pas dedicated their 2006 track "No Hem Oblidat" (We Have Not Forgotten) to Montllor.

Legacy

Lists of accomplishments

Discography

Studio releases

EPs
 "La Fera Ferotge" / "Llicó De Sumes i Verbs" / "Cançó De Les Balances" / "Cançó De Llaurador" (1968)
 "Gola Seca" / "La Fàbrica Paulac" / "Cançó d'Amor" / "Història d'Un Amic" (1969)

Singles
 Sol d'estiu / Ell (1971)

Albums
 Un entre tants... (1972)
 Crònica d'un temps (1973)
 A Alcoi (1974) (Reissued by Picap 2008)
 Salvat-Papasseit per Ovidi Montllor (1975) (Reissued by Picap 2007)
 Ovidi Montllor diu 'Coral romput''' (1979)
 Bon vent... i barca nova! (1979)
 4.02.42 (1980)
 Verí Good (posthumous, 2000; only one of its songs was finished, El Meu Poble Alcoi)

Live albums
 Ovidi Montllor a l'Olympia (1975) (Reissued by Picap 2008)
 De manars i garrotades (1977) (Reissued by Picap 2008)

Other releases
 Ovidi Montllor... per sempre (anthology, 1995)
 Antologia (exhaustive anthology, 2000)

Partial filmography

 Furia Española (1975) - Ricardo
 Furtivos (1975) - Ángel
 La ciutat cremada (1976) - Emiliano Iglesias
 La siesta (1976) - Calixto
 La nova cançó (1976, Documentary) - Himself
 Lletres catalanes (1976-1979, TV Series) - Ignasi / Gabriel de Beaumont / Josafat / El vigilant
 L'obscura història de la cosina Montse (1977) - Paco / Cousin
 La portentosa vida del padre Vicent (1978) - Miló
 Soldados (1978) - Agustín
 Companys, procés a Catalunya (1979) - Jordi
 La Sabina (1979) - Manolín
 La verdad sobre el caso Savolta (1980) - Miranda
 La campanada (1980) - Ullóa
 Con el culo al aire (1980) - Juan
 El nido (1980) - Manuel
 Viaje al más allá (1980) - Carlos
 Te quiero, te quiero, te quiero (1980)
 Sexo sangriento (1981) - El mudo
 Putapela (1981)
 La fuga de Segovia (1981) - Oriol
 Los embarazados (1982) - Luis
 El fascista, doña Pura y el follón de la escultura (1983) - Ramón Prats
 El pico (1983) - El Cojo
 El invernadero (1983) - Carlos Jiménez
 Héctor, el estigma del miedo (1984) - Héctor
 Un, dos, tres... ensaïmades i res més (1985) - Mike Vidal
 Fuego eterno (1985) - Estebanot
 Escapada final (Scapegoat) (1985) - Arnau Neyras
 Teo el pelirrojo (1986) - Luis
 Bar-Cel-Ona (1987) - Home
 La veritat oculta (1987) - Lladre
 Material urbà (1987) - Cambrer
 Amanece como puedas (1988) - Jenaro
 El aire de un crimen (1988) - Domingo Cuadrado
 Amanece, que no es poco (1988) - Pascual
 Un negro con un saxo (1989) - Director L'Hora
 Gran Sol (1989)
 El río que nos lleva (1989) - Cuatrodedos
 La banyera (1989)
 El acto (1989) - Hombre historia moneda
 Monte bajo (1989)
 La teranyina (1990) - Cordetes
 Perfidia (1991)
 El largo invierno (1992) - Juan
 Blue Gin (1992)
 El beso de la mujer araña (1996, TV Series)
 L'hivernacle''

References

External links
 Ovidimontllor.com – An unofficial Web site about Montllor

1954 births
1995 deaths
Singers from the Valencian Community
Catalan-language singers
Spanish singer-songwriters
Catalan-language poets
People from Alcoy
Deaths from esophageal cancer
20th-century Spanish singers
20th-century Spanish male singers
20th-century Spanish male actors